is a passenger railway station located in the city of Fujisawa, Kanagawa, Japan and operated by the private railway operator Odakyu Electric Railway.

Lines
It lies 46.3 kilometers from the Shinjuku terminus.

Station layout
The station consists of two island platforms serving four tracks, which are connected to the station building by a footbridge

Platforms

History
The station received its present name on April 1, 1958.

Passenger statistics
In fiscal 2019, the station was used by an average of 34,294 passengers daily.

The passenger figures for previous years are as shown below.

Surrounding area

Fujisawa Shonandai Hospital
Kanagawa Prefectural Fujisawa Comprehensive High School
Isuzu Motor Fujisawa Factory

See also
 List of railway stations in Japan

References

External links

  

Railway stations in Kanagawa Prefecture
Railway stations in Japan opened in 1929
Odakyū Enoshima Line
Railway stations in Fujisawa, Kanagawa